Michael John Worton  (born 1951) is a British scholar of French. He was Vice-Provost (International) of University College London (UCL), appointed 1998. He held this appointment concurrently with the university's Fielden Professorship of French Language and Literature. He retired at the end of September 2013.

In 2009, he wrote Review of Modern Foreign Languages Provision in Higher Education in England for the UK Government, and in the same year was appointed Higher Education Advisor to the British Council.

Early life and education

Worton was born in Luanshya, Northern Rhodesia (now Zambia), of a Yorkshire father and Scottish mother. Worton's family returned to Scotland when he was still of primary-school age, and he was educated at Sanquhar Academy and then Dumfries Academy, and the University of Edinburgh for his Master of Arts and Doctor of Philosophy degrees.  He has lectured around the world on issues in French Literature, gender studies, painting and photography, critical theory and pedagogy.  Over the past decade, he has also spoken around the world on issues in Higher Education Policy and Practice.  He is also a champion for the importance of modern languages in education.

Career

Worton's first post (1976) was as lecturer in French at the University of Liverpool. He then moved to UCL (1980), initially as lecturer in French Language and literature, and successively: Senior Lecturer in French (1991); Professor of French (Personal Chair) and Dean of Faculty of Arts(1994); appointed to Fielden Chair of French Language and Literature, as well as Vice Provost – with oversight of UCL's Teaching and Learning, and the faculties of the Arts & Humanities, and Social Sciences (1998). In 2004 his Vice Provost role expanded to 'Academic and International'.

Honours and awards
Worton was appointed Commander of the Order of the British Empire (CBE) in the 2014 Birthday Honours for services to higher education.

  1998: Chevalier dans l'Ordre des Palmes Académiques
  2005: Promoted to Officier dans l'Ordre des Palmes Académiques
  2009: Medal of Honoured Worker in Education of the Republic of Kazakhstan
 25 November 2010: President's Medal by the British Academy; "for his leadership in addressing 'the languages deficit' among British university students"

Advisory appointments
  Member, Philip Lawrence Awards Judging Panel | Member, European Science Foundation Steering Committee, 'European Reference Index for the Humanities' | Member, Higher Education Panel of the Church of England Board of Education | Chair, HEFCE/AHRC Expert Group on Research Metrics | board member, CreateKX | Member, Prime Minister's Initiative Higher Education Advisory Group | Member, QAA Development Group for Masters Level Benchmarking | Member, British Council, Education and Governance Advisory Group | Member, Research Information Network (RIN) Research and Libraries Working Group | 2007--: Director and Trustee, CARA (Council for Assisting Refugee Academics) | Member, Comité International de Consultation en Sciences Humaines et Sociales de l'Agence Nationale de la Recherche (French National Research Council) | Centre for Education and Industry Diploma in Humanities Steering Group | Appointed Higher Education Advisor to the British Council | Member of the Advisory Board for the Programme of Artistic Research of the Austrian Research Council (FWF).

Publications

  Typical Men 
  Women's Writing in Contemporary France: New Writers, New Literatures in the 1990s
  National Healths: Gender, Sexuality and Health in a Cross-cultural Context'
  Liberating Learning: Widening Participation''

References

1951 births
Living people
Alumni of the University of Edinburgh
Academics of University College London
Historians of French literature
Commanders of the Order of the British Empire
Officiers of the Ordre des Palmes Académiques
Fellows of the Chartered Institute of Linguists
People from Luanshya
Academics of the University of Liverpool
Recipients of the President's Medal (British Academy)